Audrey Mika Armacost (born July 28, 2000), known professionally as Audrey Mika, is an American singer and songwriter.

Early life
Audrey Mika Armacost grew up in Oakland, California. She grew up listening to jazz artists including Ella Fitzgerald and Louis Armstrong, and was trained in vocal jazz throughout her childhood. Prior to starting her music career, Mika danced competitively for 14 years until quitting in 2018. She posted her first video, an original song, to YouTube at the age of 15.

Career
Mika released her debut studio album, Are We There Yet, in September 2018, through Spinnup. Following this release, she began posting covers of songs by artists such as Billie Eilish and Ariana Grande to YouTube using a toy microphone from her bedroom. Her second studio album, Level Up, was a bedroom pop effort made entirely using GarageBand, and released in February 2019. In June 2019, she released the single "Y U Gotta Be Like That", which went viral on the video-sharing platform TikTok.

Her debut extended play, 5 A.M., was released in February 2020 through RCA Records. In April 2020, she released a remix of "Y U Gotta Be Like That" with featured vocals from rapper Kyle, along with a music video for the track. She appeared as a featured vocalist alongside Tate McRae on a remix of Saygrace's song, "Boys Ain't Shit", released in April 2020. The remix spawned a music video, filmed by each of the singers remotely at home. She released the single "Just Friends" in May 2020, subsequently releasing a music video. In September 2020, she released the single "Red Gatorade". Her collaboration with American DJ Gryffin, "Safe With Me", was released in November 2020.

Artistry
Mika has listed Ariana Grande, Imagine Dragons, and MARINA as influences on her music during her childhood, and listed Jhené Aiko, Dominic Fike, Omar Apollo, and Daniel Caesar as influences as well.

Discography

Albums

Studio albums

Extended plays

Singles

As lead artist

As featured artist

References

American singer-songwriters
American women singer-songwriters
2000 births
Living people
21st-century American women